Haya (Oluhaya; Swahili: Kihaya) is a Bantu language spoken by the Haya people of Tanzania, in the south and southwest coast of Lake Victoria.  In 1991, the population of Haya speakers was estimated at 1,200,000 people . Its closest relative is the Nyambo language and it is also closely related to the languages of southwest Uganda such as Nkore-Kiga, Rutooro and Runyoro which all form a group called Rutara.

Maho (2009) classifies JE221 Rashi as closest to Haya. It has no ISO 639-1 or ISO 639-2 code, but is included in ISO 639-3 as hay.

Phonology

Consonants

Vowels 

When a high vowel /i, u/ precedes a non-high vowel, it is realized as an approximant sound [j, w].

Tones 
Two tones are present in Haya; high /v́/ and low /v̀/.

Grammar

Tense 
Haya has nine tenses. These are the present progressive, the present habitual, the past habitual and the perfect, alongside two future tenses and three past tenses. The future tense F2 refers to the distant future whilst F1 refers to the near future. P1 refers to the most recent past - events that have occurred earlier in the day, P2 refers to events that happened yesterday and P3, the most distant past, refers to events that happened before yesterday.

See also 

Betbeder, Paul; Jones, John. 1949. A handbook of the Haya language. Bukoba (Tanganyika): White Fathers Printing Press.
Byarushengo, Ernest Rugwa; Duranti, Alessandro; Hyman, Larry M[ichael]. (Eds.) 1977. Haya grammatical structure: phonology, grammar, discourse. (Southern California occasional papers in linguistics (SCOPIL), no 6.) Los Angeles: Department of Linguistics, University of Southern California. Pp 213.
Herrmann, [Kapitän] C. 1904. Lusíba, die Sprache der Länder Kisíba, Bugábu, Kjamtwára, Kjánja und Ihángiro. Mitteilungen des Seminars für orientalische Sprachen, 7 (III. Abt.), pp. 150–200.
Kaji, Shigeki. (Ed.) 1998. Haya. (Textbooks for language training.) Tokyo: Institute for the Study of Languages and Cultures of Asia and Africa (ILCAA), Tokyo University of Foreign Studies.
Kaji, Shigeki. 2000. Haya vocabulary. (Asian and African lexicon series, no 37.) Tokyo: Institute for the Study of Languages and Cultures of Asia and Africa (ILCAA), Tokyo University of Foreign Studies. Pp 532. 
Kuijpers, Em. 1922. Grammaire de la langue haya. Boxtel (Hollande): Prokuur van de Witte Paters. Pp 294.
Maho, Jouni & Bonny Sands. 2002. The languages of Tanzania: a bibliography. (Orientalia et africana gothoburgensia, no 17.) Göteborg: Acta Universitatis Gothoburgensis. Pp ix, 428. 
Rehse, Hermann. 1912/13. Die Sprache der Baziba in Deutsch-Ostafrika. Zeitschrift für Kolonialsprachen, 3, pp. 1–33, 81–123, 201–229.

References

External links
https://web.archive.org/web/20061004195910/http://www.african.gu.se/tanzania/weblinks.html
http://www.linguistics.berkeley.edu/CBOLD/Docs/TLS.html (This webpage contains a Haya wordlist.)

Great Lakes Bantu languages